Limbach bei Neudau is a former municipality in the district of Hartberg-Fürstenfeld in Styria, Austria. At the 2015 Styria municipal structural reform, it was divided between the municipalities Bad Waltersdorf and Neudau.

References

Cities and towns in Hartberg-Fürstenfeld District